Manifest Destiny is the eighth and final studio album by jazz fusion group Brand X.

Track listing
"True to the Clik" (Goodsall, Pusch) – 5:31
"Stellerator" (Jones) – 6:17
"Virus" (Goodsall, Pusch) – 7:56
"XXL" (Goodsall) – 5:51
"The Worst Man" (Jones) – 4:33
"Manifest Destiny" (Goodsall, Jones, Katz, Wagnon) – 4:11
"Five Drops" (Wagnon) – 3:52
"Drum Ddu" (Jones) – 5:50
"Operation Hearts and Minds" (Goodsall) – 4:39
"Mr. Bubble Goes to Hollywood" (Jones, Katz) – 2:56

Hidden Tracks on European release

 "Disco Suicide" - Live (Robin Lumley) – 8:06
 "Bass and Drum Solo Improvisation" - Live – 9:44

Personnel
 John Goodsall – guitar, rhythm guitar, MIDI guitar, narrator, orchestra, organ, sampling, sitar, synthesizer, tubular bells, wah wah guitar
 Percy Jones – fretless bass, keyboards, sequencing, sound effects, special effects, wah wah bass
 Pierre Moerlen – drums (on hidden live tracks)
 Franz Pusch – fender rhodes, keyboards, percussion, programming, sampling, sequencing, sound effects, synthesizer, bass, vocals
 Marc Wagnon – MIDI vibes, synthesizer, vibraphone, Brass [Triggered]
 Frank Katz – drums, sampling, vocals
 Danny Wilding – flute

Additional personnel
 Ronnie Ciago – on Track 3 "Virus", rainstick, shaker, tamtam, udu

Production
 David Hentschel – engineer, producer
 Keith Lewis – technical assistance
 Mark Tessler – photography

References

External links
 

Brand X albums
1997 albums
Albums produced by David Hentschel
Cleopatra Records albums